The 2004 Georgia flag referendum was a legislatively referred advisory referendum in Georgia. It took place on March 2, 2004, alongside the state's presidential primaries. The result was overwhelmingly in favour of the 2003 flag, which gained 73.1% of the vote.

Background

The flag of Georgia adopted in 1956 contained part of the Confederate flag. In 1992, governor of Georgia Zell Miller expressed his intention to remove this Confederate imagery, describing it as the "last remaining vestige of days that are not only gone but also days that we have no right to be proud of." While legislation was introduced to change the flag, this was unsuccessful, and by 1993 Miller had conceded that changing the flag would not be possible. A 2000 report by the Georgia State Senate found the introduction of the 1956 flag to be a symbol of racist protest against desegregation.

Roy Barnes responded to calls for a new flag in 2001 by encouraging legislation on the matter. The flag that was approved was originally designed around the time of the 1992 dispute by Cecil Alexander. HB 16 was passed on January 30 2001, enacting the new flag. This design reduced the Confederate imagery to a small version of the 1956 flag. Critics labelled the flag "Barnes’s rag", and the city of Trenton adopted a modified version of the 1956 flag in protest.

In the 2002 gubernatorial election, Republican candidate Sonny Perdue defeated Barnes. Perdue ran on the promise to allow a statewide referendum on the flag of Georgia. While it was implied that the referendum would be on the 1956 flag, the initial bill, HB 380, legislated for 2 referendums; the first on a redesign, and the second (if the redesign was rejected) between the pre- and post-1956 flags. However, following concerns from some legislators, this was amended to be 1 referendum between the 2001 and 2003 flags. HB 380 was passed on the last day of the 2003 session. An executive order by Perdue ordered the redesign to be displayed by entities required to display the Georgia flag, rather than the 2001 flag.

Text
The question on the ballot read:
Should the State of Georgia keep the 2003 Flag adopted at the 2003 Session of the General Assembly or return to the 2001 Flag adopted at the 2001 Session of the General Assembly?
Both flags were pictured on the ballot.

Result

Results by county 

Source:

References

Flag controversies in the United States
Flag referendums
2004 Georgia (U.S. state) elections
Georgia (U.S. state) ballot measures